Grace Church may refer to:

Canada
 Grace Church on-the-Hill, Toronto

China
 Grace Church, Guanghan

Poland
 Grace Church, Teschen or Jesus Church, a Lutheran basilica in Teschen, Poland

United Kingdom

United States
 Grace Cathedral (disambiguation)
 Grace Church (Ca Ira, Virginia)
 Grace Church (Buena Vista, Colorado)
 Grace Church (Cincinnati, Ohio)
 Grace Church (Clarkesville, Georgia)
 Grace Church (Denver)
 Grace Church (Manhattan)
 Grace Church (Newark)
 Grace Church (Purcellville, Virginia)
 Grace Church Complex (Massapequa, New York)
 Grace Church (Scottsville, New York)
 Grace Church (Utica, New York)
 Grace Church (Providence, Rhode Island)
 Grace Church Cathedral, Charleston, South Carolina
 Grace Church Houston, Houston, Texas
 Grace Church Van Vorst, Jersey City, New Jersey
 Grace Church (Yorktown, Virginia)
 Grace Community Church, Los Angeles and other places
 Grace Reformed Episcopal Church, Havre de Grace, Maryland
 Grace Episcopal Church (disambiguation)
 Grace United Methodist Church (disambiguation)

Other
 Grace Baptist Church (numerous)